De Prins der Geïllustreerde Bladen (abbreviated as De Prins, in English: The Prince of the Illustrated Magazines) was a Dutch magazine which was published between 1901 and 1948. The magazine contained many photos, reviews and serials (such as those by Arthur Conan Doyle). There were also personal details and obituaries of important people in the magazine.

The magazine was published by Uitgeverij N.J. Boon from Amsterdam. The publisher and director was N.J. Boon.

References

External links
 De Prins der Geïllustreerde Bladen Koninklijke Bibliotheek
 WorldCat record

1901 establishments in the Netherlands
1948 disestablishments in the Netherlands
Defunct magazines published in the Netherlands
Magazines published in the Netherlands
Dutch-language magazines
Magazines established in 1901
Magazines disestablished in 1948
Mass media in Amsterdam